Hartford City is a city in the U.S. state of Indiana, and the county seat of Blackford County. Located in the northeast central portion of the state, the small farming community underwent a dramatic 15-year economic boom beginning in the late 1880s. The Indiana Gas Boom resulted from the discovery and exploitation of natural gas in the area. The rural economy was transformed to one that included manufacturing. The boom attracted workers and residents, retail establishments, and craftspeople. The increased population was a catalyst for the construction of roads, schools, and churches. After the boom came a long period of growth and stability. Agriculture (and agricultural trade) remained as the basis for the economy.

From the 1920s through the 1970s, Hartford City continued to thrive. Agricultural automation and consolidation of small farms into industrial-size farms resulted in a decline in the population; the small farmer became unable to compete and fewer laborers were needed. Some workers turned to the manufacturing and construction sectors for employment in nearby cities. However, manufacturing hubs such as Muncie and Marion suffered the collapse of their economies during industrial restructuring when large factories closed. Despite the decline, Hartford City was able to retain the paper company, 3M.

The city government has concentrated on bringing manufacturing to Hartford City and has had some success in securing state funding for businesses that use recycled or agricultural materials in the manufacturing process. Younger people leave to attend college and pursue professional careers outside the scope of those available in Hartford City. Community college, private colleges, and a university are within commuting distance; however, Hartford City lacks rental housing appropriate to college students or young adults. The town's population was 6,220 at the 2010 United States Census.

Early history

Hartford City, Indiana began in the late 1830s as a few log cabins clustered near a creek. Folklore taught in local elementary schools suggests that Hartford City was originally known as “Hart's ford,” a place to cross Lick Creek. The name evolved to Hartford, and eventually to Hartford City.

The community was designated as the county seat of Blackford County. During the last half of the 19th century, East Central Indiana consisted mostly of rural farming communities, including Hartford City. The town's population did not exceed 2,000 until after 1887, when the region began to grow because of the Indiana Gas Boom.

Hartford City's population tripled in the next decade, as manufacturers were lured to the region to take advantage of low costs for land and the natural gas. Hartford City benefited from railroad service from two railroads in addition to a natural gas supply that was thought to be unlimited. Manufacturers such as Hartford City Glass Company, Sneath Glass Company, Hartford City Paper, Utility Paper, and Willman Lumber all located or began in Hartford City during the 1890s. Although the supply of natural gas was soon exhausted, many of these businesses continued to operate into the 1950s and beyond. Hartford City leaders attracted businesses such as Overhead Door (1923) and 3M (1955) to replace the glass factories as major employers in the city.

Geography
Hartford City is located at  (40.4525, -85.3693). The area sits on top of former natural gas fields. The area also has limestone formed from silt and mud deposits of an ancient sea. The land is flat from the effect of a prehistoric glacier, and the soil is excellent for farming. 

Major highways
  Indiana State Road 3
  Indiana State Road 26

Adjacent cities
 Upland − about 8 highway miles west
 Montpelier − about 12 highway miles northeast
 Dunkirk − about 14 highway miles southeast
 Muncie − about 19 highway miles south
 Marion − about 23 highway miles northwest

Climate
Hartford City has a typical Midwestern humid continental seasonal climate. There are four distinct seasons, with winters being cold with moderate snowfall, while summers can be warm and humid. However, summer temperatures can top , and winter temperatures can drop below .

Demographics

2010 census
As of the 2010 United States Census, there were 6,220 people, 2,666 households, and 1,691 families in the city. The racial makeup of the city was 97.3% White, 0.3% African American, 0.2% Native American, 0.1% Asian, 0.1% Pacific Islander, 0.4% from other races, and 1.7% from two or more races. Hispanic or Latino of any race were 1.2% of the population.

There were 2,666 households, of which 30.3% had children under the age of 18 living with them, 44.7% were married couples living together, 12.3% had a female householder with no husband present, 6.4% had a male householder with no wife present, and 36.6% were non-families. 32.0% of all households were made up of individuals, and 15.4% had someone living alone who was 65 years of age or older. The average household size was 2.32 and the average family size was 2.86.

The median age in the city was 41.3 years. 23.1% of residents were under the age of 18; 8.4% were between the ages of 18 and 24; 23.4% were from 25 to 44; 26.7% were from 45 to 64; and 18.4% were 65 years of age or older. The gender makeup of the city was 47.6% male and 52.4% female.

2000 census
As of the 2000 United States Census, there were 6,928 people, 2,918 households, and 1,943 families in the city. The racial makeup of the city was 98.34% White, 0.09% African American, 0.38% Native American, 0.20% Asian, 0.22% from other races, and 0.78% from two or more races. Hispanic or Latino of any race were 0.61% of the population.

There were 2,918 households, out of which 30.5% had children under the age of 18 living with them, 50.8% were married couples living together, 12.1% had a female householder with no husband present, and 33.4% were non-families. 29.7% of all households were made up of individuals, and 13.9% had someone living alone who was 65 years of age or older. The average household size was 2.36 and the average family size was 2.89.

The city population contained 25.0% under the age of 18, 7.5% from 18 to 24, 27.7% from 25 to 44, 22.6% from 45 to 64, and 17.2% who were 65 years of age or older. The median age was 38 years. For every 100 females, there were 89.5 males. For every 100 females age 18 and over, there were 85.4 males.

The median income for a household in the city was $31,531, and the median income for a family was $39,654. Males had a median income of $29,257 versus $20,600 for females. The per capita income for the city was $15,596. About 7.3% of families and 10.4% of the population were below the poverty line, including 15.8% of those under age 18 and 7.7% of those age 65 or over.

Government
The government consists of a mayor and a city council. The mayor is elected in citywide vote. The city council consists of five members with four elected from individual districts and one elected at-large.

Economy

About 11 percent of Hartford City's male workers, and 9 percent of female workers, are employed in the transportation equipment industry. This makes the transportation equipment industry the most important provider of jobs for the city, although there are no auto parts plants located in the county. The decline of the auto industry has forced Hartford City to be less of a “bedroom community” reliant on jobs relating to automobile parts manufacturing in nearby cities, and more focused on developing businesses within the city. Currently, there are six businesses located in Hartford City that employ between 100 and 350 people, and none with more than 350 employees. Those six companies (in descending order of employees) are 3M Company, Petoskey Plastic, BRC Rubber Group, Inc., Blackford Community Hospital, and New Indy Paper Mill.  In addition, there are nearly twenty more local entities with 25 to 100 employees. Agriculture also influences the town. Although they do not live in the city limits, farm families are involved with the local schools, parks, and social activities – and are consumers of the products of local merchants.

Culture
The 2009 official web site of Hartford City shows three main pictures: Civil War re-enactors, a basketball player, and the courthouse, illustrating what is important to the city and its culture. Hartford City's town square is a “living museum”, and is listed on the National Register of Historic Places as the Hartford City Courthouse Square Historic District. Many of the buildings were built during the gas boom in the late 19th century, and are examples of architectural styles used at that time, including Romanesque Revival, Commercial Italianate, Renaissance Revival, and Queen Anne. The Blackford County Courthouse and First Presbyterian Church are also listed on the National Register of Historic Places. Adding to the historical atmosphere, the courthouse lawn contains war monuments on each corner. The town has a small museum and library housed in the Blackford County Historical Society building. The city's main public library, the Hartford City Public Library, is a Carnegie library that began with funding from Andrew Carnegie in 1903.

Recreation
Sports and recreation are important to the community. The city Parks Department maintains four parks and a public swimming pool. There are four golf courses within  from Hartford City, and ten more are within . The city has some small “lakes” and reservoirs available for fishing, such as Lake Placid and the lakes of the nearby Shamrock Lakes area. A larger lake (over ) is (Salamonie Lake), with boating, fishing, and swimming, is located 29 miles (47 km) northwest of Hartford City. State Parks nearby include Ouabache, Mounds, and Summit Lake. For those willing to drive north for about 90 minutes, Pokagon State Park is located on Lake James and Snow Lake. This park features campgrounds, hiking trails, a beach, the Potawatomi Inn, and a toboggan track.

Hartford City sports leagues include baseball, softball, soccer, and football. Indiana is known for its high school basketball, and Hartford City high schools have had their share of success in the state basketball tournament. Hartford City High School won 14 sectional and 3 regional tournaments in about 60 years of action. Hartford City High was consolidated into Blackford High School in 1969, and Blackford has won 10 sectionals. The Blackford High School gym seats 4,000 for a town with a population of less than 7,000. Hartford City's Blackford High School football team has also had some tournament success, winning the Indiana state 2A football championship in 1974-75 and 1979-80 – both teams were undefeated.

Agriculture
Agriculture has a strong influence on Hartford City's culture. The main crops in the area are soybeans and corn. Some wheat and hay are also grown. The Indiana Farm Bureau office for Blackford County is located in Hartford City. 4-H, a youth organization associated with the U.S. Department of Agriculture has a strong presence. The annual county 4-H fair is held in June, and features a rodeo, horse show, dog show, livestock, and carnival. The week-long event includes a mile-long parade with a marching band.

Religion

The United Methodist Church is the city's largest congregation; other churches include Catholic, Church of the Nazarene, Christian, Lutheran, Wesleyan, Baptist, and Presbyterian. The Methodists, and then the Presbyterians, were the first to build churches in town. The First Presbyterian Church and the Christian Church buildings were built during the Gas Boom in the 1890s.

Media
The local daily (except Sunday) newspaper is the News Times, and it is also available from its web site. Hartford City has a history of difficulty supporting two newspapers, and the News Times can trace its lineage back to the Hartford City News and the Hartford City Times. During the Gas Boom, the town had two weekly and two daily newspapers: Hartford City Telegram, The Hartford City Times, Hartford City Evening News, and The Daily Times.

There are at least fourteen radio stations that send moderate to very strong signals to the Hartford City area. These stations are typically located nearby, or they have an exceptional signal, such as Fort Wayne's 50,000 watt WOWO AM station. The two local radio stations are WMXQ and WHCI, both FM stations.

Indianapolis television stations such as WTTV, WRTV, WISH-TV, WTHR, and others, reach the antennas of households in Hartford City. Stations located near Hartford City include Tipton's WJSJ-CD, Marion's WSOT-LD, and Muncie's WIPB.

Education
The state of Indiana has many college options available, including well-known universities such as Ball State University, Indiana University, Purdue, and Notre Dame. The state also has one of the largest private boarding high schools, the Culver Academies.

Higher education
Hartford City has at least four universities located within  of town. (Ball State is named for the Ball brothers, who made much of their fortune with the Ball Corporation in the same Indiana Gas Boom that boosted Hartford City.) Muncie is also home to Ivy Tech State College-East Central. Its location in Upland dates from 1893, attributed to the population boom in the area at the time, and is another example of the impact of the Indiana Gas Boom.

Primary and secondary schools
 Blackford High School is located on the north side of Hartford City, and it has served the entire county since 1969. Enrollment for the 2008-2009 school year is 702 students, and 41 teachers are listed on the school roster. Hartford City High School was the town's high school prior to the 1969 consolidation of Montpelier High School. Hartford City Middle School is located on the town's west side, within easy walking distance from Sigma Phi Gamma Park. Students from grades 6 through 8 attend the middle school, and 23 teachers are listed on the roster. Students for grades 3 through 5 attend Northside Elementary School, and grades K through 4 attend Southside Elementary School.  Hartford City also has a private school – Saint John's Riedman Memorial School is a private Catholic elementary school with approximately 60 students.

Transportation

Hartford City's early transportation advantage came from the two railroad lines that crossed in the city, running north-south and east-west. The east-west line is now out of service as of 2008, but the north-south line is still in service. Both are operated by Norfolk Southern. Hartford City also has a good highway system. Indiana State Road 3 runs north-south through the city, known as Walnut Street. Indiana State Road 26 runs east-west through the city, known as Washington Street. Indiana State Road 22 used to run concurrently with State Road 26 through Hartford City, but that segment was decommissioned in the 1970s. From Hartford City, drive west on State Road 26 to reach Interstate 69. Driving north from Indianapolis, the State Road 26 exit is number 255. The Interstate's northbound exit 259, at Upland, is an easy route to travel to the north side of Hartford City. Some small airports are located near Hartford City, and larger airports in Fort Wayne and Indianapolis offer commercial flights.

See also
 Van Cleve Opera House, a former opera house in Hartford City
 National Register of Historic Places listings in Blackford County, Indiana

Notes

References

External links

 City website
 Blackford County Economic Development Corp 
 
 

Cities in Indiana
Populated places established in 1839
Cities in Blackford County, Indiana
County seats in Indiana
1839 establishments in Indiana